Marlene Ricciardi (born 3 January 1992) is an Italian female canoeist who won six medals at senior level at the Wildwater Canoeing World Championships.

References

External links
 

1992 births
Living people
Italian female canoeists
Canoeists of Marina Militare
Sportspeople from the Province of La Spezia